In Praise of Hard Industries is a book about the economic impact of fewer manufacturing jobs in the United States written by Irish journalist and author Eamonn Fingleton. It was published in 1999. The book was reissued in a 2003 paperback edition under the title Unsustainable: How Economic Dogma Is Destroying American Prosperity.

The book argues that the shift in the American work-force from industry to knowledge workers was setting the country up for an economic collapse. It criticizes financial innovation as a ruse to sell complex financial instruments and urged for more advanced manufacturing in the United States. The book argues that industrial activities create jobs and exports, and that job salaries would be protected in environments using high-end equipment.

In its first chapter, the book enunciates the “Three Strikes Against the New Economy”: a bad job mix, slow income growth. and a dearth of exports.

Reception
The book elicited strong and mixed responses.  Liberal economist James K. Galbraith said in The New York Times that Fingleton was “the sort of journalist economists despise,” arguing that the book was “anecdotal, spurning statistics or other corroboration” and that it overstated the decline of American manufacturing.

Activist Loren Goldner supported the book's message.

References

Notes
 Fingleton, Eamonn.  Unsustainable: How Economic Dogma Is Destroying American Prosperity.  Buttonwood Press, 2003.  

Business books